The 2008 USA Cycling Professional Tour is the second year of this elite men's professional road bicycle racing series organized by USA Cycling.

Levi Leipheimer (381 points) and the Discovery Channel Pro Cycling Team (810 points) are the defending champion of the overall individual and team titles, respectively.

Events 
The 2008 USA Cycling Professional Tour consists of the following 16 one-day races and stage races:

References 

"Vande Velde Wins Season Long Point Race"

USA Cycling Professional Tour, 2008
USA